The Indian women's national field hockey team represents India in international field hockey, and is governed by Hockey India. Nabhvarna are currently ranked 6th in the FIH World Rankings, and are ranked as the best team in Asia. They have won the gold medals at the 2002 Commonwealth Games and 1982 Asian Games. They have also won the Women's Asia Cup twice, i.e. in 2004 and 2017. They also won the Asian Champions Trophy in 2016.

History
The team's breakthrough performance came at the Women's Hockey World Cup at Mandelieu in 1974, where it finished in 4th place. Their best performance in the Olympic Games was at 1980 Moscow Summer Olympics (where they came in 4th), when a women's event was held for the first time in Olympic history. The team also won the Gold medal at the inaugural 1982 Asian Games held in New Delhi, defeating Korea in the finals. Captain Suraj Lata Devi led the team to the Gold for three consecutive years at different events- during the 2002 Commonwealth Games, the 2003 Afro-Asian Games, and the 2004 Women's Hockey Asia Cup. Team members were referred to as the "assi (Jasjeet) jaisi koi nahi" or the "Golden Girls of Hockey," after the 2004 win. The team earned a 3rd-place finish at the 2013 Women's Hockey Asia Cup at Kuala Lumpur defeating China in a shootout. At the 2014 Commonwealth Games, it finished in 5th place but at 2014 Asian Games, Incheon stunned Japan 2–1 in a tight match to clinch their third bronze medal at the Asian Games. During the summer of 2015, the team hosted the Round 2 of the 2014–15 Women's FIH Hockey World League and finished on top to qualify for the next stage. At the World League Semi-finals held in Antwerp the team finished in the fifth place beating higher ranked Japan in classification match. The Indian woman's national field hockey team qualified for the 2016 Summer Olympics for the first time since the 1980 Summer Olympics. They were eliminated in the group stage, however, where they placed 6th.

2002 Commonwealth Games and Chak De! India (2007)
The 2002 Commonwealth Games Squad, led by Captain Suraj Lata Devi, competed in the 2002 Commonwealth Games. The team entered the finals after defeating the New Zealand women's national field hockey team. and placed first, winning the Gold after they beat the English women's hockey team.

This event served as the inspiration for the 2007 Bollywood film about women's field hockey, Chak De! India starring Shah Rukh Khan (after screenwriter Jaideep Sahni read a short article about it). Sahni began to model the character of Kabir Khan on hockey coach Maharaj Krishan Kaushik. After hearing the storyline, Kaushik suggested that Sahni meet hockey player Mir Ranjan Negi (who faced accusations of throwing the match against Pakistan during the 1982 Asian Games). Sahni has stated that he was unaware of Negi's tribulations while writing the script and that the resemblance with Negi's life was entirely coincidental. Negi affirmed this point stating that he didn't "want to hog the limelight. This movie is not a documentary of Mir Ranjan Negi's life. It is in fact the story of a team that becomes a winning lot from a bunch of hopeless girls".  In response to the fact that the media equated Kabir Khan with Negi, Sahni said that "Our script was written a year and a half back. It is very unfortunate that something, which is about women athletes, has just started becoming about Negi."

Tokyo Olympics and resurgence
India at the 2020 Summer Olympics for the first time ever, reached the semi-final in the Women's Hockey Olympic event but failed to bag any medal after they lost to Argentina in the semi-final and then to Great Britain in the bronze medal match. Following their performance at the Olympics, the team went to win bronze medals at the 2022 Asia Cup and the Commonwealth Games and a third place finish in the 2021–22 Pro League. In 2022 India won the first ever FIH Women's Nations Cup.

Medal table

Tournament record

Summer Olympics

World Cup

Commonwealth Games

Asian Games

Asia Cup

Asian Champions Trophy

FIH Pro League

FIH Hockey Nations Cup

South Asian Games

Defunct competitions

World League

Champions Challenge

Hockey Series

Afro-Asian Games

Results and fixtures

2022

Players

Current squad
The following 22 players were named for the 2022 India tour of South Africa Test Series in Cape Town.

Caps updated as of 22 January 2023, after the match against South Africa.

Head coach: Janneke Schopman

Recent call-ups
These players were called-up in the last 12 months.

Awards
Summer Olympics
During the 2008 Women's Field Hockey Olympic Qualifier, the team ranked fourth in the "Qualifying Two" event. Rani Devi received the Most Promising Young Player of the Tournament award. (Squad)

Hockey World Cup
During the 2001 Women's Hockey World Cup Qualifier, the team ranked 7th. Sanggai Chanu received the Young Player of the Tournament award. (Squad)

Hockey Champions Challenge
 During the 2002 Hockey Champions Challenge, Jyoti Sunita Kullu received the Topscorer award for five goals. (Squad)

Dhyan Chand Award
 Mary D'Souza Sequeira (1953–1963)

Arjuna Awards
The following is a list of recipients for the Arjuna award in hockey recipients (by year):
 Helen Mary, 2004
 Suraj Lata Devi (former captain), 2003
 Mamta Kharab, 2002
 Madhu Yadav, 2000
 Tingonleima Chanu, 2000
S. Omana Kumari, 1998
 Pritam Rani Siwach (former captain), 1998
 Prem Maya Sonir, 1985
 Rajbir Kaur, 1984
 Varsha Soni, 1981
 Eliza Nelson, 1980–1981
 Rekha B.Mundhphan, 1979–1980
 Lorraine Fernandes, 1976–1977
 Ajinder Kaur, 1975–1976
 Dr. Otilia Mascarenhas, 1973–1974
 Sunita Puri, 1966
 Elvera Britto, 1965
 Anne Lumsden, 1961

See also
Field hockey in India
India men's national field hockey team
India women's national under-21 field hockey team
Chak De India

References

External links

FIH profile

1
National team
Asian women's national field hockey teams
Hockey